Thagyamin (from Sanskrit  Śakra) is the highest-ranking nat (deity) in traditional Burmese Buddhist belief. Considered as the king of Heaven, he is the Burmese adaptation of the Hindu deity Indra.

Etymology 
Thagyamin is derived from the combination of the Sanskrit word "Shakra" (शक्र; a synonym of Indra) and the Burmese word "Min" (a common title meaning Lord/King). He is also known by his nickname ''U Magha'' derived from his preexistential name.

Description
Thagyamin is often portrayed as holding a conch shell in one hand, and a yak-tail fly-whisk in the other, and seated or standing atop a three-headed white elephant (Airavata). He is described as the ruler of  the celestial kingdom Trāyastriṃśa. 

He was designated as the supreme deity of the official pantheon of 37 ahtet nat (အထက်နတ်, upper deities) by King Anawrahta in the 11th century, in an effort to streamline animist and Hindu practices among the populace and merge these practices with Theravada Buddhism. He is the only nat in the official pantheon not to have undergone a sudden and violent death, called a "raw" death (အစိမ်းသေ).

According to Burmese traditional folklore, every year at the first day of Thingyan (the Burmese new year), Thagyamin visits the earth while being invisible. There, he observes every person: he records the names of good people in a golden book, and writes the names of evildoers in a book made of dog-skin leather. On the third day of Thingyan, he returns to heaven.

Gallery

See also 
Counterparts of Thagyamin in other Asian cultures
 Amenominakanushi, the Japanese counterpart 
 Haneullim, the Korean counterpart of Yuanshi Tianzun
 Indra, the Hindu counterpart
 Jade Emperor, the Chinese counterpart
 Śakra, the Buddhist counterpart
 Tengri, the Mongolian counterpart
 Yuanshi Tianzun, the Taoist counterpart

References

01